Amoeba proteus is a large species of amoeba closely related to another genus of giant amoebae, Chaos. As such, the species is sometimes given the alternative scientific name Chaos diffluens.

This protozoan uses extensions called pseudopodia to move and to eat smaller unicellular organisms. Food is enveloped inside the cell's cytoplasm in a food vacuole, where ingested matter is slowly broken down by enzymes. A. proteus inhabits freshwater environments and feeds on protozoans, algae, rotifers, and even other smaller amoebae. They are colorless, but they may have colored inclusions derived from its food.

A. proteus possesses a thick-walled nucleus containing granular chromatin, and is therefore a eukaryote. Its membrane includes a phospholipid bilayer similar to other eukaryotic organisms.

History
The first description of this amoeba is probably that of August Johann Rösel von Rosenhof who, in 1755, published drawings of an amoeboid protozoan he called the "little Proteus". Subsequently, various authors assigned Rösel's organism and other amoeboid protozoa various names: Carl Linnaeus termed Rösel's organism Chaos protheus in 1758. Otto Friedrich Müller referred to it as Proteus diffluens in 1786. In 1878, Joseph Leidy proposed the current name Amoeba proteus to describe Rösel's Proteus, Proteus diffluens, and another described amoeba Amoeba princeps.

Reproduction

Although Amoeba proteus has most of the key proteins associated with sexual processes (as do other amoebae), no evidence of meiosis or sexual activity has been reported.

Video gallery

See also
Amoeba
Amoebiasis

References

Tubulinea
Articles containing video clips
Taxa named by Peter Simon Pallas
Taxa named by Joseph Leidy